Faith literate describes the ability of an individual to become knowledgeable of  other religions and faith other than the one a person believes in.

Philosophy
A faith literate individual understands the key effects of each religion/belief system by means of the values, attitudes and influence it causes in individuals, families and communities. Faith literates believe in recognizing religious and secular worldviews in practice and thoughts and take hold of what makes each religion/belief system what it is. IT involves understanding and knowing the fundamental formative attribute of all religions.

Present scenario
In the United Kingdom, there are institutes and consultancies being set up that offer religious understanding training for the public and private sectors. Even the government is also committed to a program of faith literacy in the public sector. This is aimed to be significantly enhance organizational multiplicity among other things. Faith literacy is also intended to facilitate a move beyond the functional levels of conversation.
 World Bank in its 2007 publication highlighted the need to build up the values and mechanisms for faith literacy among development institutions
 The subject of faith literacy is at the centre of debates, challenges, plans and practices of faith in the public sphere.

Acceptance
Tony Blair, former British Prime Minister, also mentioned in an interview that he reads Quran and Bible every day since it is crucial to be faith literate in a globalised world like ours. In Uganda, the Bishop of Kigezi also urged the government patrons to be more ‘faith literate’. Realizing the importance of this concept, the Economic and Social Research Council in UK started a three-year research paper in faith literacy.

References

External links 
 Active Faith Communities

Religion
Knowledge
Literacy